The DB-Engines Ranking ranks database management systems by popularity, covering over 380 systems. The ranking criteria include number of search engine results when searching for the system names, Google Trends, Stack Overflow discussions, job offers with mentions of the systems, number of profiles in professional networks such as LinkedIn, mentions in social networks such as Twitter. The ranking is updated monthly. It has been described and cited in various database-related articles.

By grouping over specific database features like database model or type of license, regularly published statistics reveal historical trends which are used in strategic statements.

History 
The DB-Engines DBMS portal was created in 2012 and is maintained by the Austrian consulting company Solid IT.
Based on its ranking, DB-Engines grants a yearly award for the system that gained most in popularity within a year. The award winners are:

 2013 - MongoDB
 2014 - MongoDB
 2015 - Oracle
 2016 - Microsoft SQL Server
 2017 - PostgreSQL
 2018 - PostgreSQL
 2019 - MySQL
 2020 - PostgreSQL
 2021 - Snowflake
 2022 - Snowflake

Methodology 

The ranking comes from an average of the following parameters after normalization:

 Number of mentions in search engines queries
 Google
 Bing
 Yandex
Frequency of searches
 Google Trends
 Number of related questions and the number of interested users
 Stack Overflow
 DBA Stack Exchange
 Number of job postings
 Indeed
 Simply Hired
 Number of profiles in professional networks
 LinkedIn
 Upwork
 Number of mentions in social networks
 Twitter

References

External links 
 

Database management systems
Lists of database management software
Relational database management systems